Alejandro Pozuelo Melero (born 20 September 1991) is a Spanish professional footballer who plays as attacking midfielder for Süper Lig club Konyaspor.

Developed in the Betis system, he amassed La Liga totals of 40 matches and three goals for that club and Rayo Vallecano. In 2014 he signed with Genk from Swansea City, going on to spend several seasons in the Belgian Pro League with the former team. In 2019, he joined Major League Soccer side Toronto FC, moving to Inter Miami three years later.

Club career

Betis
Born in Seville, Andalusia, Pozuelo spent his youth career at his local club Real Betis. He made his senior debut with the B team, spending two seasons in the Segunda División B.

Pozuelo made his official debut with the main squad on 2 October 2011, playing the second half of a 0–1 La Liga home loss against Levante UD. On 18 December he scored his first league goal for the Verdiblancos, as well as being sent off in the 2–0 win at Atlético Madrid.

Pozuelo was promoted to Betis' first team for the 2012–13 campaign. He appeared in a total of 13 games in all competitions, netting his only goal in a 5–3 away victory over Athletic Bilbao.

In total, Pozuelo made 33 appearances during his tenure, scoring three goals.

Swansea City

On 2 July 2013, Pozuelo joined Swansea City on a three-year contract for an undisclosed fee, signing alongside teammate José Cañas and becoming the seventh Spaniard in the squad. He scored on his debut for the club, rounding off the scoring in a 4–0 home defeat of Malmö FF in the first leg of the third qualifying round of the UEFA Europa League. He netted his second in the same competition and also at the Liberty Stadium on 22 August 2013 in a 5–1 play-off round win against Romania's FC Petrolul Ploiești.

During his spell in Wales, Pozuelo played 36 matches across all competitions, scoring twice and adding six assists.

Rayo Vallecano
Pozuelo returned to his country's top division on 24 July 2014, joining Rayo Vallecano for an undisclosed fee. His first competitive appearance took place on 14 September, as he came on as a 61st-minute substitute in a 2–3 home loss to Elche CF.

Pozuelo took part in 13 official games in his only season, registering one goal in the Copa del Rey against Valencia CF.

Genk
On 31 August 2015, Pozuelo moved abroad again, signing a two-year deal at Belgian First Division A team K.R.C. Genk. He scored six goals in 2016–17, helping to a final eighth position in the regular season. He later became their captain, and collected a total of 175 appearances in all competitions over five seasons, with 25 goals and 60 decisive passes.

In February 2019, Toronto FC planned to trigger Pozuelo's €8 million release clause, however, a disagreement ensued with Genk questioning the validity of the release clause and refusing to allow the player to move. Following a lengthy transfer discussion, the two sides reached a compromise for the player to finish out the main portion of the season with the latter and join the former on 18 March. When he left, his team were sitting in first place in the domestic league.

Toronto FC

On 4 March 2019, Pozuelo signed with Major League Soccer side Toronto FC as a designated player, as a replacement for the recently departed Sebastian Giovinco and compatriot Víctor Vázquez in the creative midfield role, also inheriting the number ten shirt which had previously been worn by the Italian. He made his debut late in the same month in a 4–0 home win over New York City FC, assisting the opening goal of the match by teammate Jozy Altidore and later scoring two himself – one from the penalty spot Panenka-style and one chipped over the goalkeeper. He finished as the team's top scorer in the regular season with twelve goals while also adding twelve assists, and was named to the MLS Best XI.

On 23 October 2019, Pozuelo scored twice in a 2–1 win over New York City FC in the playoffs' Eastern Conference semi-finals, including a 90th minute Panenka-style penalty kick which was his third of the campaign in that fashion. On 10 November, he set up Altidore's injury-time goal in a 3–1 away defeat to Seattle Sounders FC in the MLS Cup Final.

Pozuelo started every match during the 2020 campaign, scoring nine goals and recording ten assists (the joint most in the league) as he led his side to the second best record in the regular season. He was named to the Best XI for a second consecutive year, and on 7 December was awarded the Landon Donovan MVP Award for the league's best player. On 2 July 2022, he played his 100th official match, a 0–2 home loss against Seattle Sounders.

Inter Miami
On 7 July 2022, Pozuelo was traded to Inter Miami CF for $150,000 in General Allocation Money as well as additional conditional GAM depending on certain performance metrics. On 14 August, his brace helped the hosts to defeat New York City 3–2.

Konyaspor
On 3 March 2023, Pozuelo agreed to a short-term deal at Turkish Süper Lig club Konyaspor.

Style of play
A versatile and creative midfielder with good ball skills, technique and an eye for goal, Pozuelo usually plays in a playmaking role as an attacking midfielder, although he is also capable of playing as a central midfielder. Although naturally right-footed, he is capable of playing off of either foot, and is known for his vision and ability to provide assists for teammates. Toronto FC president Bill Manning described him as "a guy who can pull the strings, someone who can manage the game, make the special plays that make goals", while the club's manager Greg Vanney described him as "an attacking player first and foremost. We want to use him in that role. He’ll play close to [Altidore] and we’ll use him a lot in setting up our attacks. He's outstanding at understanding how to move around, manipulate numbers on the field, play between lines. [He has] the vision for the final pass and the ability to spring some of our guys as runners. But it’s also his ability to finish plays off in different ways. For us it’s the engine through that final phase of our attack.”

Pozuelo has also been used as a false-nine on occasion.

Career statistics

Club

Honours
Toronto FC
Canadian Championship: 2020
Eastern Conference Championship (Playoffs): 2019

Individual
Landon Donovan MVP Award: 2020
Major League Soccer All-Star Game: 2019
MLS Best XI: 2019, 2020
Red Patch Boys Player of the Year: 2019, 2020
MLS Player of the Month: September 2020

References

External links

1991 births
Living people
Spanish footballers
Footballers from Seville
Association football midfielders
La Liga players
Segunda División B players
Betis Deportivo Balompié footballers
Real Betis players
Rayo Vallecano players
Premier League players
Swansea City A.F.C. players
Belgian Pro League players
K.R.C. Genk players
Major League Soccer players
Toronto FC players
Inter Miami CF players
Designated Players (MLS)
Süper Lig players
Konyaspor footballers
Spanish expatriate footballers
Expatriate footballers in Wales
Expatriate footballers in Belgium
Expatriate soccer players in Canada
Expatriate soccer players in the United States
Expatriate footballers in Turkey
Spanish expatriate sportspeople in Wales
Spanish expatriate sportspeople in Belgium
Spanish expatriate sportspeople in Canada
Spanish expatriate sportspeople in the United States
Spanish expatriate sportspeople in Turkey